Transatlanticism may refer to:

Transatlanticism (album), album by Death Cab for Cutie 2003 
Transatlanticism (culture), the cultural exchange between Great Britain and the United States, as reflected in British and American literature
Transatlanticism, or Atlanticism, the belief in or support for strong relations between North America and Europe
Transatlantic relations